Cole House may refer to:

Cole House or Cole Farm or variations may refer to:

in the United States (by state then town or city)
Hagler-Cole Cabin, Bella Vista, Arkansas, listed on the National Register of Historic Places (NRHP)
Cole House (Los Angeles), designed by Harry Gesner for Fred Cole
Cole's Five Cypress Farm, Stockton, California, listed on the NRHP in San Joaquin County, California
Cole-Hatcher-Hampton Wholesale Grocers, Columbus, Georgia, listed on the NRHP in Muscogee County, Georgia
 Cole House (Paris, Idaho), listed on the NRHP in Bear Lake County, Idaho
 Cole House (Park Ridge, Illinois), a demolished house designed by Bruce Goff
Joseph J. Cole Jr. House and 1925 Cole Brouette No. 70611, Indianapolis, Indiana, NRHP-listed
Cole-Evans House, Noblesville, Indiana, listed on the NRHP in Hamilton County, Indiana
James Omar Cole House, Peru, Indiana, NRHP-listed
Richard Cole Homestead, Midway, Kentucky, listed on the NRHP in Woodford County, Kentucky
Cole's Hill, Plymouth, Massachusetts, NRHP-listed
E. Merritt Cole House, Southbridge, Massachusetts, NRHP-listed
Benjamin Cole House, Swansea, Massachusetts, NRHP-listed
 Cole House (Winchester, Massachusetts), NRHP-listed
Frank W. Cole House, Crystal Falls, Michigan, NRHP-listed
Williams-Cole House, Durand, Michigan, listed on the NRHP in Shiawassee County, Michigan
Gordon Cole and Kate D. Turner House, Faribault, Minnesota, listed on the NRHP in Rice County, Minnesota
Arthur W. and Chloe B. Cole House, Houston, Missouri, an octagon house that is NRHP-listed
Benjamin Young House (Stevensville, Montana), known also as Cole House
Cole-Allaire House, Leonia, New Jersey, listed on the NRHP in Bergen County, New Jersey
Thomas Cole House, Catskill, New York, a National Historic Landmark
Cole Cobblestone Farmhouse, Mendon, New York, NRHP-listed
Cole-Hasbrouck Farm Historic District, Modena, New York, NRHP-listed
Black-Cole House, Eastwood, North Carolina, NRHP-listed
David Cole House, Portland, Oregon, NRHP-listed
Warren Z. Cole House, Skippack, Pennsylvania, NRHP-listed
John Cole Farm, Cumberland, Rhode Island, NRHP-listed
Alex Cole Cabin, Gatlinburg, Tennessee
 Cole House (Nashville, Tennessee), listed on the NRHP in Davidson County, Tennessee
Cole-Hipp House, Waxahachie, Texas, listed on the NRHP in Ellis County, Texas
William I. Cole House, Fond du Lac, Wisconsin, listed on the NRHP in Fond du Lac County

People
 Cole House (cyclist), American cyclist

See also
Cole Block (disambiguation)
Cole Building (disambiguation)